John Louis Zendejas (July 21, 1944 – August 3, 1994) was an American film and television actor. Born in Dunsmuir, California. He was perhaps best remembered as "Marshal Terrence Gummell", being murdered by Michael Myers in the 1981 horror film Halloween II, the sequel of the 1978 film Halloween. His other well-known role was as "Supervisor Wagner" in the 1983 hit drama film Bad Boys. His final film was the 1990 film Catchfire, where he played the role of the "Trucker".

Zenda served in the United States Air Force, in which he also served in the Vietnam War. He made guest appearances on a number of television shows including Wonder Woman, The Bionic Woman, The Incredible Hulk, and Falcon Crest. Zenda died of pancreatic cancer in August 1994, at the age of 50. He was buried in Riverside National Cemetery.

Filmography

References

External links 

Rotten Tomatoes profile

1944 births
1994 deaths
People from Dunsmuir, California
Male actors from California
American male film actors
American male television actors
20th-century American male actors
Burials at Riverside National Cemetery
United States Army personnel of the Vietnam War